Ian Charles Calderon (born October 19, 1985) is an American politician serving in the California State Assembly. He is a Democrat who represented the 57th Assembly District, which encompasses the Gateway Cities and portions of the San Gabriel Valley from 2012-2020. He served as the Assembly Majority Leader from 2016 to 2020. In November 2019, he announced that he would not be running for reelection in 2020, citing his desire to spend more time with his growing family.

He is the son of former Assemblymember and State Senator Charles Calderon. He is also the nephew of former Assemblymember and State Senator Ron Calderon and of former Assemblymember Tom Calderon. His stepmother, Lisa Calderon, succeeded him in the Assembly.

Electoral history

2014 California State Assembly

2016 California State Assembly

2018 California State Assembly

References

External links 
 
 Campaign website
 Ian Charles Calderon at ballotpedia.org
 Photos
 Join California Ian Calderon

1985 births
21st-century American politicians
American politicians of Mexican descent
Ian
California State University, Long Beach alumni
Hispanic and Latino American state legislators in California
Living people
Democratic Party members of the California State Assembly